is a scholar of Japanese literature, particularly of the Man'yōshū.

Overview 

He is the honorary president of the Nara Prefecture Complex of Manyo Culture, president of the Koshinokuni Museum of Literature, and has been a guest lecturer at Princeton University.

In 1970 he was awarded the Japan Academy Prize for his research in comparative literature and the Man'yōshū, and in 2013 he received the Order of Culture. He has been called "probably the greatest living scholar of the Man'yōshū in Japan".

References

1929 births
Japanese literature academics
Living people
Man'yōshū
Persons of Cultural Merit
Recipients of the Order of Culture
University of Tokyo alumni